Authoring software can refer to:

Optical disc authoring, software to create media on CDs and DVDs
Authoring system, software made so non-programmers can produce content, usually for educational use

Technology and engineering disambiguation pages